Euxanthic acid is a xanthonoid glycoside, a conjugate of the aglycone euxanthone with glucuronic acid. Its magnesium salt is the primary colourant of the pigment Indian Yellow.

References

Xanthonoids